Sin dejar rastros (Spanish: "Without a Trace") is a 1918 lost Argentine animated feature film. It was written and directed by Quirino Cristiani. The film used cutout animation.

Plot
The plot revolved around the recent incident involving the German commander Baron von Luxburg who sank an Argentine ship intending to frame the Entente for the act. Reports from survivors helped everyone to realize what had truly happened.

Reception
The film was not as successful as Cristiani's previous film El Apóstol from 1917, since Sin dejar rastros was confiscated by the Ministry of Foreign Affairs by order of President Hipólito Yrigoyen. It is unknown if any copies of the film exist, and is considered a lost film.

See also
List of animated feature-length films

External links

1918 films
1918 animated films
Animated feature films
Argentine animated films
Argentine silent feature films
Argentine black-and-white films
Cutout animation films
Films directed by Quirino Cristiani
Lost animated films
1910s Spanish-language films
1910s stop-motion animated films
Animated films based on actual events
World War I films based on actual events
World War I naval films
1918 lost films
Documentary films about World War I
World War I submarine films
Silent adventure films
Silent war films